This is a list of seasons completed by the Idaho Vandals football team. The Vandals compete in the Big Sky Conference in the NCAA Division I Football Championship Subdivision (FCS). Representing the University of Idaho in Moscow, Idaho, the Vandals  play home games on campus at the 16,000-seat Kibbie Dome; it opened as an outdoor venue in 1971 and was enclosed in 1975. 

Idaho began playing football  in 1894 as an independent, and was a member of the Pacific Coast Conference from 1922 through 1958; the PCC disbanded the following spring. After playing for six years as a University Division independent, the Vandals joined the Big Sky for football in 1965, where they remained for over thirty years. The Big Sky moved up to the new Division I-AA in 1978; Idaho moved down and often made the I-AA postseason playoffs for over a decade.

In 1996, Idaho moved back to Division I-A as a member of the Big West Conference, and went to the Sun Belt Conference (football only) when the Big West stopped sponsoring football after 2000. After four seasons in the Sun Belt, Idaho joined the Western Athletic Conference in 2005, only to return to the Sun Belt nine years later when the WAC dropped football. The Sun Belt dropped Idaho as a football member after 2017, and rather than attempt to exist as an isolated FBS independent, as they had in 2013, Vandal football became the first FBS program to voluntarily drop to FCS in 2018 and returned to the Big Sky, where Idaho's other teams had rejoined in 2014.

The Vandals are led by head coach Jason Eck, who was hired after the 2021 season in December.

Seasons

Notes

References

Idaho

Idaho Vandals football seasons